Dance Dance Revolution Universe  (also known as Dancing Stage Universe in Europe) is a music video game. It was released as a part of Dance Dance Revolution franchise by Konami for the Xbox 360. The game was unveiled on May 9, 2006 at the Electronic Entertainment Expo in Los Angeles.

Gameplay
DDR Universe comes bundled with a plastic mat that is meant to be plugged into console while spread out on the floor. Arrows pointing in different directions scroll up the screen, and the players have to perform corresponding steps on the mat. By doing so, points are gained.

Upon the first launch, the game takes the player into Basic Edition, which serves as a tutorial. It consists of How to Play (dancing lessons) and Lesson Mode, a series of 22 tests that teaches every technique in the game. Experienced players can go right to the Master Mode where all the normal game modes are available (quest, party, workout, training, quest, Xbox Live, challenge, edit and jukebox).

The main, Quest mode has the player travelling around the country to compete against the AI while unlocking new songs by earning money, party mode is made of a collection of minigames for up to four players. Also, Challenge Mode gives certain objectives to accomplish for each of the songs, Workout is intended for players to burn off calories, and Edit Mode allows customization of the dance steps for songs and creation of personalized tracks.

The game makes extensive use of Xbox Live, including online play, player ranking, and downloadable song packs via purchase with Microsoft Points. It also features music from Chris Brown, Kylie Minogue, Depeche Mode, and others.

Music
There are over 60 songs, some being available through DLC or by unlocking through Quest mode.

Default songs
By default, the songs included are:

Downloadable songs
Mega Pack

References

External links
DDR Universe Official Homepage at Konami

2007 video games
Dance Dance Revolution games
North America-exclusive video games
Video games developed in the United States
Xbox 360-only games
Xbox 360 games